CILAS is a French company, a subsidiary of Ariane Group, specialized in laser and optics technology, founded in 1966. This high-technology engineering company was the inventor of the particle size analyzer. Today, it develops, manufactures and produces systems combining laser and precision optics in the field of high technology, accounting. Products for the military represent 50% of turnover against 50% civilian.

History 
This company was founded in 1966 by two companies : CGE (Compagnie Generale d'Électricité becoming Alcatel-Alsthom) and Saint-Gobain. The aim was to exploit industrially and commercially the work of laboratories working on laser sources and laser equipment.

In 1983, it became CILAS-Alcatel. In 1985, it was absorbed by two companies of optics : SORO Electro-Optics and BBT (Barbier Bernard and Turenne). Alcatel withdraws its laser activities in 1989, resulting in a change of ownership. In early 1990, the capital is divided between three companies, CEA Industries (now Areva), SAT and Unilaser Holding (Aerospace Group). CILAS-Alcatel becomes CILAS.

Meanwhile, from late 1989, the Unilaser group also acquired the Optronics Division of Alcatel Marcoussis laboratories and named it Laserdot. Unilaser now gather Quantel, LISA, CILAS and Laserdot.

From this moment, Laserdot and CILAS collaborate on joint projects. Laserdot is more oriented toward research and development whereas CILAS toward industrialization and production.

In 1994, SAT withdraws CILAS' capital and shares of the two remaining shareholders passed to 57% for Unilaser and 43% for CEA Industry. On September 1, 1995, CILAS and Laserdot are merged into a single entity which retains the name CILAS.

Defence and security 
Cilas develops and manufactures different products in the field of defence and security. It offers laser designators, counter-snipers optical sight systems detectors, rangefinders, airborne laser sources and shipborne helicopters landing aids.

References 
 The M4 adaptive unit for the E-ELT, B Crepy, 2009
 Multifunction laser source for ground and airborne applications, B Crepy, 4th International Symposium on Optronics in Defence and security in Paris, 2010
 Mechanism of the liquid-phase sintering for Nd:YAG ceramics, R. Bouleisteix, A. Maître, J-F. Baumard, C. Sallé, Y. Rabinovitch, 2008 (elsevier)
 Five factors to consider when choosing a particle size analyzer, Nicolas Marchet, PBE/I, 2010
 Conference ceramics department - Optro 2010, Y. Rabinovitch, 2010
 Progress on the laser source for DIRCM presented for the 4th International Symposium on Optronics in Defence and security in Paris (2010), B, Crépy, 2009
 Stand-off biological detection by lif (laser induced fluorescence) lidar - Optro 2010, O. Meyer, 2010
 Temperature insensitive laser for very compact designation function on small platforms - Optro 2010, J. Montagne, 2010

External links
 Official website

Optics manufacturing companies
Technology companies of France
Laser companies
Articles containing video clips